Johannes Albrecht Blaskowitz (10 July 1883 – 5 February 1948) was a German Generaloberst during World War II. He was a recipient of the Knight's Cross of the Iron Cross with Oak Leaves and Swords. After joining the Imperial German Army in 1901, Blaskowitz served throughout World War I, where he earned an Iron Cross for bravery. 

During WWII, Blaskowitz led the 8th Army during the Invasion of Poland and was the Commander in Chief of Occupied Poland from 1939 to 1940. He wrote several memoranda to the German high command speaking out against SS atrocities, and he handed out death sentences to SS members for crimes against Polish civilians. Based upon these actions against the SS, Adolf Hitler personally limited Blaskowitz's future advancement. He commanded Army Group G during the Allied invasion of Southern France and Operation Nordwind, the last major German offensive of World War II on the Western Front. Blaskowitz later commanded the remnants of Army Group H as it withdrew to Northern Netherlands before surrendering to Allied forces.

After the war, he was charged with war crimes in the High Command Trial at Nuremberg. He committed suicide during the trial on 5 February 1948.

Early years
Johannes Blaskowitz was born on 10 July 1883 in the village of Paterswalde, (East Prussia), Germany (now Bolshaya Polyana in the Kaliningrad Oblast, Russia). He was the son of a Protestant pastor, Hermann Blaskowitz, and his wife Marie Blaskowitz, née Kuhn. In 1894, Blaskowitz joined cadet school at Köslin (now Koszalin, Poland) and afterwards at Berlin Lichterfelde. In 1901, he started his military career as a supreme officer candidate cadet in an East Prussian regiment in Osterode (Polish: Ostróda).

During World War I, Blaskowitz served on the Eastern and Western Fronts and was employed in the General Staff. He rose to command an infantry company by 1918, and was awarded the Iron Cross for bravery.

Interwar period

Blaskowitz's war service secured him a place in the small postwar Reichswehr during the Weimar Republic, through whose ranks he rose to the rank of General. His attitude towards the Nazis' seizure of power in 1933 was reportedly indifferent because he believed that the armed forces should be "politically neutral".

In early 1939 he commanded the German forces that occupied Czechoslovakia, and was promoted to General of Infantry and given command of the 8th Army just prior to the outbreak of World War II.

Invasion of Poland

During the invasion of Poland, the 8th Army under Blaskowitz's command was responsible for the northern part of the front under Army Group South, led by Gerd von Rundstedt.  The 8th Army saw heavy combat during the Battle of the Bzura and later besieged the Polish capital of Warsaw. On 28 September 1939, Blaskowitz accepted the surrender of General Tadeusz Kutrzeba and the Polish forces in Warsaw. After the campaign, he was awarded the Knight's Cross of the Iron Cross, promoted to Generaloberst and appointed as Commander-in-Chief East in Poland on 20 October 1939.

As a traditional soldier, Blaskowitz kept firm control on the men under his command in their dealings with civilians and was opposed to Army participation in war crimes by the SS and Einsatzgruppen. He handed out death sentences to members of the SS for crimes against the civilian population, which were rescinded by Adolf Hitler. Between November 1939 and February 1940 he wrote several memoranda to higher military officials, in which he detailed SS atrocities in Poland, their negative effects on Wehrmacht soldiers, the insolent attitude of the SS toward the army and warned that the SS "might later turn against their own people in the same way." However, his protests failed to produce results, and merely earned him the enmity of Hitler, Hans Frank, Reinhard Heydrich and Heinrich Himmler, while Chief of Staff Alfred Jodl dismissed them as naive and "uncalled for".

Commander-in-Chief Walther von Brauchitsch forwarded Blaskowitz's first memorandum to Hitler on 18 November, who launched a tirade against Blaskowitz, denouncing his concerns about due process as "childish" and poured scorn on his "Salvation Army attitude." In February 1940, Blaskowitz prepared a list of 33 complaints against the SS. Among his complaints were strip searches and rape of Jewish women, a whipping orgy in Nasielsk affecting 1,600 Jews, and a clear case of race mixing committed by a junior SS officer. Blaskowitz concluded that "It is a mistake to massacre some 10,000 Jews and Poles, as is being done at present; for—so far as the mass of the population is concerned—this will not eradicate the idea of a Polish state, nor will the Jews be exterminated." Blaskowitz was relieved of his command on 29 May 1940. Having thus encountered Hitler's wrath, Blaskowitz was the only Generaloberst at that time who was not promoted to Generalfeldmarschall in summer 1940 after the fall of France.

Occupation of France
Following the Fall of France in May 1940, Blaskowitz was initially slated to command the 9th Army for occupation duties, but the appointment was blocked by Hitler and instead he was appointed to a relatively minor position as Military Governor of Northern France, a position he held until October 1940, when he was transferred to the command of the 1st Army, on the southwest coast between Brittany and the Pyrenees. 

On 10 November 1942, the 1st and 7th Army under Blaskowitz's command launched Case Anton, the military occupation of Vichy France. The 1st Army advanced from the Atlantic coast, parallel to the Spanish border, while the 7th Army advanced from central France towards Vichy and Toulon. The 50,000-strong Vichy French Army took defensive positions around Toulon, but when confronted by German demands to disband, it did so since it lacked the military capability to resist. By the evening of 11 November, German tanks had reached the Mediterranean coast. Anton marked the end of the Vichy regime as a nominally independent state. However, Blaskowitz's forces failed to secure the Vichy French fleet at Toulon, which was scuttled by the French.

In May 1944, following the appointment of Gerd von Rundstedt as Commander-in-Chief in the West, Blaskowitz was appointed the head of Army Group G. This comparatively small command, consisting of the 1st Army and the 19th Army, was given the task of defending southern France from the imminent Allied invasion. When in Normandy, he managed to convince Field Marshal Erwin Rommel that the "rumours" Rommel had heard about atrocities on the Eastern Front were actually true.

According to historian Christopher Clark, in France, Blaskowitz tried to "build a constructive relationship with the local population", even though the conditions for him to do so were worse than in Poland. He encouraged the troops deployed to support French agriculture to act "selflessly". On the one hand, he tried to ensure that German counterinsurgency would be conducted in accordance with international norms as far as possible. He publicly distanced himself from units that committed the Oradour-sur-Glane massacre. On the other hand, when the prefects in Toulouse complained about crimes against civilians in "counter-terrorism" procedures conducted by the SS, Blaskowitz defended the right of the German army to defend itself, even though he admitted sometimes innocent people were harmed: "..He recommended that the French authorities be told that "it is imperative that innocent people sometimes fall victim to the bullet [...]. Against such a struggle [namely on the part of the partisans of the Resistance], the Wehrmacht must and will defend itself under all the means of power at its disposal." After the July Bomb Plot, he sent a note that proclaimed loyalty to Hitler. Clark speculates that he might have feared that he was suspected. There was no evidence that suggests Blaskowitz ever protested the deportation of Jews from France. Although army appraisal forms, compiled by Rundstedt, described him as a National Socialist, Christopher Clark opines that Blaskowitz likely never had any ideological attachment to Nazism. According to Clark, professionalism enabled Blaskowitz to follow his own principles even against the political Zeitgeist, but the same professionalism made him unsuitable for political resistance. After a visit in October 1943, German resistance member Ulrich von Hassell lamented that it was not fruitful to discuss with Blaskowitz who saw everything from a military point-of-view. From this "very bounded standpoint", whatever one thought about the regime's moral character became overshadowed by duty to his superiors and his troops, as well as the people whose fate "now hung in balance."

The invasion of southern France commenced on 15 August 1944, with Operation Dragoon, when Allied forces landed on the Riviera between Toulon and Cannes. Blaskowitz, though badly outnumbered and lacking air defence, brought up troops, stabilized the front, and led a fighting withdrawal to the north to avoid encirclement. U.S. Army units pursued Blaskowitz's forces up through the Vosges mountains before pausing to regroup and refuel. There, Blaskowitz's troops were reinforced by the 5th Panzer Army under Hasso von Manteuffel. Blaskowitz wanted to entrench his forces, but Hitler ordered him to immediately counterattack the U.S. Third Army. Both Manteuffel and Blaskowitz realized the futility of such an action, but obeyed orders, and their attack caught U.S. forces in disarray and pushed them back to near Lunéville on 18–20 September 1944, at which point resistance stiffened and the attack was suspended. As a result, Hitler summarily relieved Blaskowitz, replacing him with Hermann Balck.

Campaign in the West 1944–45
In December 1944, Blaskowitz was recalled to his previous command and ordered to attack in the vicinity of Alsace-Lorraine in support of the ongoing Ardennes offensive. On 1 January 1945 Army Group G engaged the U.S. 7th Army during Operation Nordwind, forcing them to withdraw.

Blaskowitz was subsequently transferred to the Netherlands, where he succeeded Kurt Student as commander of Army Group H. For the following three months he conducted a fighting withdrawal against the British 2nd Army, and was awarded the Swords to his Knight's Cross. This command was redesignated in early April 1945 and Blaskowitz became commander-in-chief of the northern (still occupied) part of the Netherlands. During the Dutch famine of 1944–45, Blaskowitz allowed air corridors for Allied airdrops of food and medicine to the Dutch civilian population.

On 5 May Blaskowitz was summoned to the Hotel de Wereld in Wageningen by Lieutenant-General Charles Foulkes, (commander of I Canadian Corps), to discuss the surrender of the German forces in the Netherlands. Prince Bernhard, acting as commander-in-chief of the Dutch Interior Forces, attended the meeting. Blaskowitz agreed with all proposals by Foulkes. However, nowhere in the building – some sources say nowhere in the whole town – could a typewriter be found. Thus, the surrender document could not be typed. The next day, both parties returned and, in the presence of both Foulkes and Prince Bernhard, Blaskowitz signed the surrender document, which in the meantime had been typed.

Indictment and trial
Blaskowitz was tried for war crimes at the High Command Trial (Case No. 12), one of the subsequent Nuremberg trials. In one notorious case he was accused of ordering the execution of two deserters after the German surrender. He committed suicide on 5 February 1948: after breaking away from his guards, he jumped off a balcony into the inner courtyard of the court building.

According to Hans Laternser, the defence council for the lead defendant Wilhelm von Leeb, the prosecution told him that "Blaskowitz did not need to do that as he would certainly have been acquitted", leading to Laternser questioning the indictment. According to Clark, Blaskowitz could have counted on an acquittal. In historian Norbert Frei's book on the elites of Nazi Germany, it is stated that the Nuremberg judges expressly saw Blaskowitz as a positive example of how Wehrmacht officers could have behaved. Both the indictment and the suicide have been considered an enigma by scholars ever since, because he likely would have been acquitted on all counts and had been told by his defense to expect to be acquitted.

Decorations
Iron Cross (1914)
2nd Class (27 September 1914)
1st Class (2 March 1915)
Clasp to the Iron Cross (1939)
2nd Class (11 September 1939)
1st Class (21 September 1939)
German Cross in Silver on 30 October 1943 as Generaloberst and commander-in-chief of the 1. Armee
Knight's Cross of the Iron Cross with Oak Leaves and Swords
Knight's Cross on 30 September 1939 and General der Infanterie and commander-in-chief of the 8. Armee
640th Oak Leaves on 29 October 1944 as Generaloberst and commander-in-chief of the Heeresgruppe G
146th Swords on 25 April 1945 as Generaloberst and commander-in-chief of the Netherlands

References
Citations

Bibliography

Blaskowitz, Johannes - German reaction to the invasion of southern France - (ASIN B0007K469O) - Historical Division, Headquarters, United States Army, Europe, Foreign Military Studies Branch, 1945
Blaskowitz, Johannes - Answers to questions directed to General Blaskowitz - (ASIN B0007K46JY) - Historical Division, Headquarters, United States Army, Europe, Foreign Military Studies Branch, 1945

 
 

 
Kemp, Anthony (1990 reprint). German Commanders of World War II  (#124 Men-At-Arms series). Osprey Pub., London. .

Information on his death - The New York Times, February 6, 1948, p. 13
Information on his death - The Times, February 8, 1948, p. 3

 

1883 births
1948 deaths
People from Gvardeysky District
People from East Prussia
German Army generals of World War II
Colonel generals of the German Army (Wehrmacht)
German Army personnel of World War I
Prussian Army personnel
Recipients of the Knight's Cross of the Iron Cross with Oak Leaves and Swords
Recipients of the Military Merit Cross (Bavaria)
Suicides by jumping in Germany
People indicted by the United States Nuremberg Military Tribunals
Recipients of the clasp to the Iron Cross, 1st class
German military personnel who committed suicide
Lieutenant generals of the Reichswehr